All in Blood with You is the second album by the Iranian heavy metal band Ahoora, released originally inside Iran on September 30, 2007. The album was re-mastered and available for free download in 2010.

Reception 
Sound on Sound wrote: “the band's technical ability puts to shame many of the demos I've heard from more liberal regimes. They play with an assured power and precision” 
Metal Mayhem called it “…already one of the favorites of the year”  while Ultimate Metal called it “an incredible release that everyone should check out”

Track listing

Personnel 
Milad Tangshir – rhythm guitars, backing vocals
Ashkan Hadavand – lead vocals
Mamy Baei – bass
Alireza Saeidian – lead guitar
Ida Norheim-Hagtun - Female vocals on track 7
Produced by Ahoora
Engineered, mixed and mastered by Mamy Baei
Recorded at Digital Circus, Tehran. April/June 2007
Artwork: Alireza Saeidan

References 

2007 albums
Ahoora albums